Live is a double DVD live release that was recorded in the Hammerstein Ballroom at Manhattan Center Studios during their 2002 "Untouchables" tour. It also features some live tracks from their self-titled album, and albums Life Is Peachy, Follow the Leader, and Issues, as well as part of their cover of Metallica's "One" that was later performed for 2003 Metallica's "MTV Icon" special in its entirety. The second DVD features the same show, but from alternate angles, as well as some behind-the-scenes material. This release has been certified Gold by RIAA. Live was directed by Jim Gable.

Set list
Preshow/Opening (0:33)
"Here to Stay" (from Untouchables) (4:14)
"Twist" (from Life Is Peachy) (0:48)
"A.D.I.D.A.S." (from Life Is Peachy) (2:18)
"Trash" (from Issues) (3:21)
"Blind" (from Korn) (3:58)
"Embrace" (from Untouchables) (4:38)
"Faget" (from Korn) (5:37)
"Falling Away from Me" (from Issues) (4:24)
"Blame" (from Untouchables) (3:38)
"Make Me Bad" (from Issues) / "One" (Metallica cover) / "Justin" (from Follow the Leader) (4:07)
"Freak on a Leash" (from Follow the Leader) (4:13)
"Somebody Someone" (from Issues) (3:45)
"Thoughtless" (from Untouchables) (4:22)
"Shoots and Ladders" (from Korn) (4:01)
"Got the Life" (from Follow the Leader) (3:46)
Credits ("No One's There") (1:41)

See also
Korn video albums

References

Korn video albums
2002 live albums
2002 video albums
Live video albums
Albums recorded at the Hammerstein Ballroom